Men's Combined World Cup 1985/1986

Final point standings

In Men's Combined World Cup 1985/86 the best 3 results count.

Men's Combined Team Results

All points were shown. bold indicate highest score - italics indicate race wins

References
 fis-ski.com

World Cup
FIS Alpine Ski World Cup men's combined discipline titles